Anne Godfrey-Smith  (30 November 1921 – 15 June 2011) was an Australian poet, theatre director and women's activist.

Early life and education 
Godfrey-Smith was born on 30 November 1921 in Launceston, Tasmania. Her mother, Margaret Edgeworth McIntyre (née David), was the first woman to be elected to the Tasmanian parliament. Her father, William Keverall McIntyre, practised as an obstetrician.

Her education began in Launceston at Broadland House Church of England Girls Grammar School, but from 1935 to 1938 she was sent to board at Frensham School in Mittagong, New South Wales.

She graduated from the University of Sydney in 1941 with a BSc in biochemistry. She later took a BA at the Australian National University, followed by an MA at Flinders University for her thesis on Samuel Beckett.

Career 
In the 1940s she worked as a pathologist at Sydney's Royal North Shore Hospital. Following her marriage, she and her husband, Rowland Anthony (Tony) Godfrey-Smith, moved to Launceston where she continued her involvement in theatre as part-time actor, producer and director with the Launceston Players, the company her mother had founded in 1926. When her husband undertook postgraduate training in England in 1950 she was given the opportunity by Tyrone Guthrie to spend five months at the Stratford-on-Avon Memorial Theatre where she developed her theatre production and management skills.

Returning to the Launceston Players, she also worked as producer/director for the local opera company. In 1953 she moved to Canberra as full-time producer and manager for the Canberra Repertory Society. The following year she was divorced by her husband on the grounds of desertion. In the late 1950s she married Robert Johnson and at the end of 1958 she resigned from Canberra Repertory Society.

In 1975 Godfrey-Smith was appointed by the National Youth and Children's Performing Arts Association to conduct an Australia-wide survey of young people and the performing arts, producing a detailed report on her findings in late 1977.

In the 1980s she served on the Theatre Board of the Australia Council and in 1986 was appointed to the ACT Arts Development Board.

Honours and recognition 
Godfrey-Smith was awarded the British Empire Medal in the 1980 New Year Honours "for service to theatre". She was ACT Citizen of the Year in 1994, while in the 2005 Australia Day Honours she was recognised with the Medal of the Order of Australia "for service to the arts, particularly through a range of theatre, literary and cultural organisations".

Death and legacy 
Godfrey-Smith died in Narrabundah on 15 June 2011. She was survived by her two sons.

In recognition of her contribution to the formation and operation of the ACT Writers Centre, the Anne Edgeworth Fellowship for emerging young writers was inaugurated. Her papers are held in the National Library of Australia.

Works

Poetry

Prose

References 

1921 births
2011 deaths
People educated at Frensham School
University of Sydney alumni
Australian National University alumni
Flinders University alumni
Australian pathologists
Australian women poets
Australian theatre directors
Recipients of the Medal of the Order of Australia
Australian recipients of the British Empire Medal